Regional elections were held in Denmark in March 1925. 11289 municipal council members were elected.

Results of regional elections
The results of the regional elections:

Municipal Councils

References

Local and municipal elections in Denmark
Denmark
Local
March 1925 events